21 Today is the fourth studio album by UK singer Cliff Richard and fifth album overall. The Album feature The Shadows on every track. It was released through EMI Columbia Records on 14 October 1961, the exact date of Cliff Richard's 21st birthday and was his first No. 1 in the UK album chart.

Track listing

Chart positions

Release formats
 Vinyl LP mono & stereo (1961)
 Audio CD (1998)

Personnel
Cliff Richard and the Shadows
 Cliff Richard – lead vocals
 Hank Marvin – lead guitar
 Bruce Welch – rhythm guitar
 Jet Harris – bass guitar
 Tony Meehan – drums

References

Cliff Richard albums
1961 albums
Albums produced by Norrie Paramor
EMI Columbia Records albums